Teneryville is an unincorporated community in Gregg County, located in the U.S. state of Texas.

Notes

Unincorporated communities in Gregg County, Texas
Unincorporated communities in Texas